Jangyeon No clan was one of the Korean clans. Their Bon-gwan was in Changyon County, South Hwanghae Province. According to the research in 2015, the number of Jangyeon No clan was 10907. Their founder was  who became Prince of Jangyeon. He was a 4th son of  who was dispatched to Silla when he was a Hanlin Academy in Tang dynasty.

See also 
 Korean clan names of foreign origin

References

External links 
 

 
Korean clan names of Chinese origin